Henry Cowell's 1938 work Rhythmicana is a suite of piano pieces centered on polyrhythms and dissonant counterpoint.

Background

Cowell had already used the title for his rhythmicon concerto seven years earlier. The complexity results from Cowell's lifelong preoccupation with rhythmic exploration. The piece is dedicated to J. M. Beyer.

References

External links
 

20th-century classical music
1938 compositions
Compositions by Henry Cowell
Compositions for solo piano
Compositions that use extended techniques
Modernist compositions